The Wish Machine (Russian: Маши́на жела́ний, Mashína zhelániy, literally "Machine of wishes"), also called Stalker, is a screenplay by Arkady and Boris Strugatsky for the 1979 movie Stalker that in turn is based on the fourth chapter of their 1972 novel Roadside Picnic, published in Avrora issues 7–9.

There are two versions of it: an early draft, printed by Text Publishers, and the second one, published in Сборник научной фантастики, 1981, issue 25.

The latter one was translated:
 to French: Stalker. Pique-nique au bord du chemin (1981) by Svetlana Delmotte
 to Polish: Maszyna życzeń, by Paweł Porwit in: Kwazar 01 (13) 1983
 to Hungarian: Stalker (1984) by Iván Földeák
 to Swedish: Stalker (1987) by Kjell Rehnström and Sam J. Lundwall

References

Further reading 
 Машина желаний. Стругацкие и Тарковский

1979 novels
Novels by Arkady and Boris Strugatsky
Novels based on films